Bernard Muwanga (born 25 August 1993) is an Ugandan international footballer who plays for Proline FC, as a defender and midfielder

Career
Born in Kampala, he has played club football for Bright Stars, SC Villa and Kampala Capital City Authority.

He made his international debut for Uganda in 2015.

References

External links

1993 births
Living people
Ugandan footballers
Uganda international footballers
Bright Stars FC players
SC Villa players
Kampala Capital City Authority FC players
Proline FC players
Association football defenders
Association football midfielders
Sportspeople from Kampala
Uganda A' international footballers
2016 African Nations Championship players
2018 African Nations Championship players